Cycas javana is a species of cycad in Indonesia. It is found primarily in Java, as well as southern Sumatra and possibly the western Sunda Islands.

References

javana
Flora of Java
Flora of Sumatra